The 1993–94 United Counties League season was the 87th in the history of the United Counties League, a football competition in England.

Premier Division

The Premier Division featured 22 clubs which competed in the division last season, no new clubs joined the division this season.

League table

Division One

Division One featured 16 clubs which competed in the division last season, along with one new club:
Northampton Vanaid, joined from the Northampton Town League

League table

References

External links
 United Counties League

1993–94 in English football leagues
United Counties League seasons